Podrah is a neighbourhood of South Howrah, in Howrah district, West Bengal, India.

It houses one of the largest Multispeciality hospital in the district of Howrah, NH Multispeciality Hospital.

Geography

Podra is flanked by Santragachhi and Green Park in the North, Shibpur in the East, Garden Reach and the Ganges River in the South and Mullick Para Lane, Chunabhati Road and Mourigram in the West.

Demographics
Podra was a part of the Kolkata Urban Agglomeration in 2011 census.

As per the 2011 Census of India, Podra had a total population of 21,589, of which 11,220 (52%) were males and 10,369 (48%) were females. The age of 91.54% of the population is above 6 years and while 2,143 people were younger than 6. The literacy rate is 82.45%.

Transport
Andul Road (part of Grand Trunk Road/State Highway 6) is the artery of the town.

Bus

Private Bus
 61 Alampur - Howrah Station
 80 Chunabhati - Howrah Station

Mini Bus
 13 Ranihati - Rajabazar
 13A Fatikgachi - Rajabazar
 20 Alampur - Ultadanga Station
 20A Mourigram - Salt Lake Tank no. 13

Bus Route Without Number
 Andul railway station - New Town Ecospace

Train
Mourigram railway station on Howrah-Kharagpur line is the nearest railway station.

Education
Podrah is home to many educational institutions:

 Howrah South Point School
 St. Xavier's High School
 Narayana School
 Oxford High School
 Maria's Day School
 Kidzee Pre-school
 The George Telegraph Training Institute
 Westbank School of Nursing
 LN Model School
 Rahi Kid's Planet School
 SIP Abacus Learning Center
 [IITE] Ideal Institute of Technical Education
 Painting School of Fine Arts [PSFA], Podrah, Podrah Board Primary School, Andul Road, Near NH Narayana Multispeciality Hospital, Dist- Howrah, Pin- 711109, West Bengal, India.
 RYCSM Computer Learning Center
 ICan Learning Center
 Youth Computer Training Center
 Podrah High School
 Goaberia High School 
 Podrah Mahakali High School
 Podrah Board Primary School

References

Cities and towns in Howrah district
Neighbourhoods in Howrah
Neighbourhoods in Kolkata
Kolkata Metropolitan Area